Esteban Gerard Contreras (born 28 February 1953, in Mexico City) is a sailor from Mexico. Gerard represented his country at the 1968 Summer Olympics in Acapulco. Gerard took 18th place in the Dragon with Javier Velázquez as helmsman and Roberto Sloane as fellow crew member. Gerard represented his country again at the 1972 Summer Olympics in Kiel, Germany. Gerard took then 23rd place in the Soling with Armando Bauche as helmsman and Daniel Escalante as fellow crew member.

References

Living people
1950 births
Mexican male sailors (sport)
Sportspeople from Mexico City
Sailors at the 1968 Summer Olympics – Dragon
Sailors at the 1972 Summer Olympics – Soling
Olympic sailors of Mexico